U.S. Route 82 (US 82) is a section of a west-east highway that travels through Mississippi. It starts at the Arkansas state line at Refuge and ends at the Alabama state line east of Columbus.

Route description
As are most other US numbered highways in the state, this entire section of US 82 is defined in Mississippi Code Annotated § 65-3-3.

Through the entire state, the highway is four-laned with interchanges at major junctions.  After crossing the Mississippi River from Arkansas via the four-laned, cable-stayed Greenville Bridge, the road briefly travels northeast toward central Greenville, then turns east toward Leland, where it intersects US 61, as US 278 breaks it concurrency and goes on to follow US 61 north. US 82 continues eastward, intersecting US 49W in Indianola, US 49E in Greenwood, I-55 and US 51 in Winona, and passing through Starkville.

From Starkville east through Columbus up until the Alabama state line, US 82 is built to freeway standards. It forms a brief concurrency with US 45 in Columbus, as both highways cross the Tennessee-Tombigbee Waterway together via an unnamed bridge. As US 45 heads north, US 82 continues to wind its way around the city, finally crossing into Alabama almost immediately after an interchange with Lee Stokes Road.

History
US 82 was first requested by MDOT in part as a route that extended from Texarkana, Arkansas to Columbus. Their request was approved on July 1, 1931 after a similar request was made from AHTD processed a similar request. Eventually, in June 1934, an expansion to Tuscaloosa was approved and completed in the same year. The length of US 82 began shortening sometime just before 1939, mainly within cities. The length of the highway in the state was shortened even further by 1942.

Future
Construction is now underway on a U.S. 82 bypass around Greenville. The new road will commence at the Greenville Bridge and terminate at the current US 82 near Leland, creating a half-loop freeway around South Greenville. Cloverleaf interchanges are presently being built at the freeway's junctions with MS 454 and MS 1. The bypass is scheduled for completion in fall 2025. This new bypass will be the southern terminus for the planned freeway connector to Interstate 69, which is also under construction through the northern Mississippi Delta.

Junction list

References

External links

 Mississippi
82
Transportation in Washington County, Mississippi
Transportation in Sunflower County, Mississippi
Transportation in Leflore County, Mississippi
Transportation in Carroll County, Mississippi
Transportation in Montgomery County, Mississippi
Transportation in Webster County, Mississippi
Transportation in Oktibbeha County, Mississippi
Transportation in Lowndes County, Mississippi